T.A.P.O.A.F.O.M. is a 1996 album by funk musician George Clinton. The title, which is an abbreviation for The Awesome Power of a Fully Operational Mothership, refers to the P-Funk Mothership that was first introduced in 1975 on Parliament's Mothership Connection album. The album was presented as a reunion album because it featured collaborations with former Parliament-Funkadelic members including Bernie Worrell, Bootsy Collins, Junie Morrison, Maceo Parker, and Fred Wesley — some of whom hadn't worked with Clinton in many years. The album also included contributions by current members of the P-Funk All-Stars.

Following the release of T.A.P.O.A.F.O.M., Clinton launched the "Mothership Reconnection Tour" with Bootsy Collins, Bernie Worrell, and the P-Funk All-Stars. The Mothership Reconnection Tour, which began in New York's Central Park, included the landing of a full-scale Mothership on stage, from which Clinton emerged. The artwork for T.A.P.O.A.F.O.M. was unique among P-Funk albums in that it included contributions by all three artists associated with the band: Pedro Bell, Ronald "Stozo the Clown" Edwards, Overton Loyd, and George Clinton. The Japanese version of "T.A.P.O.A.F.O.M." contains an extra track entitled "Secret Love", co-written by Clinton's son Tracey Lewis a.k.a. Trey Lewd. That track was later released in U.S. on the CD How Late Do U Have 2BB4UR Absent?.

Track listing

Notes
 "Summer Swim" was released as a 12" single, Sony 550 - 46 78391.
 "If Anybody Gets Funked Up (It's Gonna Be You)" was released as an extended remix single, Sony 550 - BSK 7760.

References

External links 
 T.A.P.O.A.F.O.M. at Discogs

1996 albums
George Clinton (funk musician) albums
Albums with cover art by Pedro Bell